The Haller Ebene is a plain in the German state of Baden-Württemberg which forms part of the Hohenlohe Plain and stretches from Bad Mergentheim via Rothenburg, Uffenheim, Crailsheim, Öhringen as far as Schwäbisch Hall. The Haller Ebene specifically refers to that region of the Hohenloher Ebene around the town of Schwäbisch Hall.

Natural regions of Germany
Regions of Baden-Württemberg
Natural regions of the Neckar and Tauber Gäu Plateaus